The 2014 European Taekwondo Championships was the 21st edition of the European Taekwondo Championships, and was held in Baku, Azerbaijan from May 1 to May 4, 2014.

Medal table

Medal summary

Men

Women

Participating nations

 
 

 

 
 
 
 
 

 

 
 (1)

 
 
 (3)
 (4)

References

External links 
 European Taekwondo Union

European Taekwondo Championships
European Championships
Taekwondo Championships
European Taekwondo Championships